Michael Richard Heffernan (3 April 1885 – 21 November 1970) was an Irish politician, sportsperson and soldier.

Early life
While working as a bank clerk in Skibbereen, County Cork, Heffernan played rugby for Cork Constitution in the 1900s and by 1911 had risen to the level of playing for the Ireland national rugby union team, earning 4 caps including one against England and one against France. He had also played for Munster Rugby.

In 1911 Heffernan emigrated to Canada, continuing his career as a bank clerk there. In 1914 he enlisted with the Canadian Army and fought in World War I. Following the war he returned to Ireland and began farming on the family holding at Kilmurray Lodge, Ballyneally, near Carrick-on-Suir, County Tipperary in 1920.

Political career
Heffernan was county secretary of the South Tipperary Farmers Association. He was first elected to Dáil Éireann at the 1923 general election as a Farmers' Party Teachta Dála (TD) for Tipperary. In 1927 he became the final leader of the Farmers' Party. He led the party into coalition with Cumann na nGaedheal and for this he was appointed as Parliamentary Secretary to the Minister for Posts and Telegraphs Ernest Blythe from 1927 to 1932. By 1932 the Farmer's Party had lost its voter base of farmers to Cumann na nGaedheal, who were able to secure the backing of large farmers, and to Fianna Fáil, who were able to secure the backing of the farmers with smallholdings. In the face of this, the Farmer's Party dissolved, with both their supporters and their members going in three directions: Cumann na nGaedheal, Fianna Fáil, and a final holdout cohort who created the short-lived National Centre Party.

Heffernan himself joined Cumann na nGaedheal, standing as one of their candidates at the 1932 general election. He was not successful however and ended up losing his seat. Following his defeat he retired from politics.

He was manager of the Arklow Pottery plant in County Wicklow from 1934 until his retirement. He died at his home in Dalkey, County Dublin on 21 November 1970, aged 85 years old.

References

1885 births
1970 deaths
Farmers' Party (Ireland) TDs
Cumann na nGaedheal politicians
Members of the 4th Dáil
Members of the 5th Dáil
Members of the 6th Dáil
Irish farmers
Politicians from County Tipperary
Parliamentary Secretaries of the 6th Dáil